Edward J. Houghton (1843 – July 16, 1868) was an American sailor who received a Medal of Honor for his actions in the American Civil War whilst serving in the U.S. Navy.

Biography 
Houghton was born in Mobile, Alabama in 1843. He served as an Ordinary Seaman in the U.S. Navy during the Civil War. He earned his Medal of Honor on October 27, 1864, whilst serving aboard U.S. Picket Boat No.1. Houghton died in Norfolk, Virginia on July 16, 1868, and is now buried in Holyhood Cemetery, Brookline, Massachusetts.

Medal of Honor Citation 
Houghton served on board the U.S. Picket Boat No. 1 in action, 27 October 1864, against the Confederate ram Albemarle, which had resisted repeated attacks by our steamers and had kept a large force of vessels employed in watching her.

References 

1843 births
1868 deaths
American Civil War recipients of the Medal of Honor